KUOZ-LP (100.5 FM) is a College radio station licensed to serve Clarksville, Arkansas. The station is owned by the University of the Ozarks. It airs a College radio format.

The station was assigned the KUOZ-LP call letters by the Federal Communications Commission on July 2, 2003.

References

External links
KUOZ-LP official website
University of the Ozarks

UOZ-LP
UOZ-LP
UOZ-LP
Johnson County, Arkansas
Radio stations established in 2003